Antonio da Lonate (born  1456–1457, Lonate Pozzolo - died after 1541, Milan) was an Italian architect who is known for his Renaissance architecture. A follower of Donato Bramante, his works were designed in the High Renaissance style. Among the works attributed to him are the altar at the Basilica of San Magno in Legnano and the Vigevano Cathedral.

References

1450s births
15th-century Italian architects
16th-century Italian architects
Architects from Milan
Renaissance architects